Lucius Antoine Tyson (7 March 1911 – September 1972), who performed as Dr. Sausage or Doc Sausage, was an American singer, dancer, drummer and bandleader.  He was active from the 1930s to the 1950s and is best known for his 1950 recording of "Rag Mop".

Career 
He was born in Brunswick, Georgia, and moved to New York City in 1936.  By 1938, he was performing with his group, Dr. Sausage and His Five Pork Chops.  Regarded as a novelty act, the group included Al "Dr. Horse" Pittman. His pianist Jimmy Harris was killed in a car crash that year, but the following year the group performed as a "specialty" feature in a revue, Lew Leslie's Blackbirds of 1939, at the Hudson Theatre. Their act was influenced by performers such as Cab Calloway, and contained comedy, swing jazz, and vocal harmonies.  The group first recorded for Decca Records in 1940, on a version of "Wham (Re-bop-boom-bam)" featuring Gerry "The Wig" Wiggins on piano.  However, neither it nor other tracks for Decca were commercially successful.

Tyson did not record again until 1950, when his new group, Doc Sausage and His Mad Lads, recorded for the Regal label.  As well as Doc Sausage on vocals and drums, the group comprised Earl Johnson (tenor saxophone), Charles Harris (piano), Charlie Jackson (guitar), and Jimmy Butts (bass).  The group recorded eight tracks, including a version of "Rag Mop" which reached number 4 in the Billboard R&B chart, and its follow-up, "Sausage Rock".  The record company went out of business soon afterwards, and Tyson seems not to have recorded again.

Tyson died in New York in 1972 at the age of 61.

Selected discography

Singles 
 Doc Sausage and His Five Pork Chops
 Decca DE 7736
 Recorded March 19, 1940, New York City
 Gerry "The Wig" Wiggins (piano), Lucius Tyle (drums), (rest of the performers unknown)
Side A (67347 matrix): "Wham" ("Re-Bop-Boom-Bam") (© 1939) (ensemble, vocalists)
By Taps Miller (né Marion Joseph Miller; born 22 July 1915 Indianapolis) (w&m)
By Eddie Durham (w&m)
(audio on YouTube)
(audio on YouTube)
Side B (67349 matrix): "Doctor Sausage's Blues" (Tyson, vocalist)
By Lucius Tyson (w&m)
(audio on YouTube)

 Decca DE 7776
 Recorded March 19, 1940, New York City
Side A (67346 matrix): "Cuckoo Cuckoo Chicken Rhythm" (ensemble, vocalists)
By Lucius Tyson (w&m)
(audio on YouTube)
Side B (67348 matrix): "Birthday Party" (ensemble, vocalists)
(audio on YouTube)

 Doc Sausage and his Mad Lads
 Regal 3248 (1950)
Side A (1120 matrix): "She Don't Want Me No More"
By Lucius Tyson (w&m)
Side B (1121 matrix): "Please Don't Leave Me Now"
By Lucius Tyson (w&m)
 Regal 3251
 Recorded 1950
 Earl Johnson (tenor sax), Charles Harris (piano), Charlie Jackson (guitar), and Jimmy Butts (bass)
Side A (1141 matrix): "Rag Mop" (© 1950)
By Johnnie Lee Wills & Deacon Anderson (1925–2011) (w&m)
(audio on YouTube)
Side B (1142 matrix): "You Got Me Cryin'" (© 1950)
By Howard Biggs & Fred Madison (1917–2000) (w&m)
(audio on YouTube)
 Regal 3256
 Recorded February 1, 1950, Linden, New Jersey
 Earl Johnson (tenor sax), Charles Harris (piano), Charlie Jackson (guitar), Doc Sausage (drums)
Side A (1144 matrix): "Sausage Rock" (© 1950)
By Lucius Tyson (w&m)
Side B (1143 matrix): "I've Been a Bad Boy" (© 1950)
By Lucius Tyson (w&m)

 Doc Sausage
 Regal 3283 (78 rpm) (1949)
Side A (1122 matrix): "Poor Man's Blues"
By Lucius Tyson (w&m)
(audio on )
Side B (1119 matrix): "Doormat Blues"
By Lucius Tyson (w&m)
(audio on )

Compilations 
Doc Sausage and His Five Pork Chops
 Blue Moon Records, Barcelona CD (1996); 
The Complete Recordings 1946–1949: Luke Jones & Doctor Sausage
(67346 matrix): "Cuckoo Cuckoo Chicken Rhythm," DE 7776
(67347 matrix): "Wham" ("Re-Bop-Boom-Bam"), DE 7736
(67348 matrix): "Birthday Party," DE 7776
(67349 matrix): "Doctor Sausage's Blues," DE 7736

 Doc Sausage and his Mad Lads
 Blue Moon Records, Barcelona, BM-6012 (1995)
 Blue Moon Records, Barcelona, BMCD-6004 (CD)
 
The Complete Recordings 1940–1953: Lem Johnson, Doc Sausage & Jo Jo Jackson
(1119 matrix): "Door Mat Blues," RE 3283
(1120 matrix): "She Don't Want Me No More," RE 3248
(1121 matrix): "Please Don't Leave Me Now," RE 3248
(1122 matrix): "Poor Man's Blues" ("I'm A Poor Man") RE 3283
(1141 matrix): "Rag Mop," RE 3251
(1142 matrix): "You Got Me Cryin'," RE 3251
(1143 matrix): "I've Been a Bad Boy," RE 3256
(1144 matrix): "Sausage Rock," RE 3256
 Jewel Records, San Rafael, California, JR-0199 (1999)
 
The Swing Session
(1144 matrix): "Sausage Rock," RE 3256
 P-Vine Special, Tokyo, PLP-9037 (1981)
 
Sax Blowers & Honkers
(1144 matrix): "Sausage Rock," RE 3256
 Proper Records, P1341–P1344 (2003)
 
The Big Horn: The History of the Honkin' & Screamin' Saxophone
(1144 matrix): "Sausage Rock," RE 3256
 Proper Records Properbox 61 (2003)
 
The Big Horn: Boogie's The Thing
(1144 matrix): "Sausage Rock," RE 3256
 Delmark DL-438, DD-438 (CD)
 
Honkers & Bar Walkers (Vol. 1 of 3)
(1144 matrix): "Sausage Rock," RE 3256
 Hoy Hoy Records (1992)
 
The Rocking 40's
(1144 matrix): "Sausage Rock," RE 3256
 Hoy Hoy Records (1993)
 
Rock Before Elvis, Before Little Richard, Before Chuck Berry, Bo Diddley or Bill Haley
(1144 matrix): "Sausage Rock," RE 3256
 Bear Family Records (2005)
 
Blowing the Fuse: 28 (29) R&B Classics That Rocked the Jukebox in 1950
(1141 matrix): "Rag Mop" RE 3251
 Stash Records STB 2516/17 (CD) (1995)
 
The Hoy Hoy Collection: Rock Before Elvis
(1144 matrix): "Sausage Rock," RE 3256
Track 13, Disc 1 of 2
 Großer & Stein GmbH, Pforzheim, 223237-354 (2005)
 Membran International GmbH
 
Rhythm 'n' Blues: Nasty (Disc 1 of 4)
(1144 matrix): "Sausage Rock," RE 3256

References

External links
 Doc Sausage at Allmusic.com

1911 births
1972 deaths
American jazz singers
People from Brunswick, Georgia
20th-century African-American male singers